Dobriany (Dobryany, Dobrjany) is a village in Stryi Raion, Lviv Oblast in western Ukraine. It belongs to Stryi urban hromada, one of the hromadas of Ukraine. Local government is administered by Dobrianska village council. The population of the village is about 1822 people.

Geography 
The village is situated on a hill along the Stryi River. During the spring when been flood, flooded river banks, but height average the village is 285 meters.

History 
The first mention of Dobriany dates from the year 1375. This is one of the oldest villages in Stryi District.

Cult constructions and religion 
The village has an architectural monument of local importance of Stryi Raion (Stryi district) – Church of St. Demetrios (stone) 1821 (2385 –м).

Gallery

Personalities 
 Rev. Anton Petrushevych (1821, Dobriany – 1913, Lviv) – Ukrainian historian and philologist, Greek Catholic priest.
 Rev. Oleksiy Bazyuk (1873–1952) – Ukrainian Greek Catholic priest, Apostolic Administrator of Bosnia-Hercegovina (1914–1925).

References

External links 
 village Dobriany
 weather.in.ua
 У Стрию відкрилася виставка про найстаріше село району 

Villages in Stryi Raion